Wonderland is a British bi-monthly magazine based in Notting Hill, London, dedicated to lifestyle, fashion and popular culture. It was launched in September 2005 by editor Huw Gwyther under Visual Talent Ltd., after proposing the business idea as a pitch on the first series of the British television programme Dragons' Den in late 2004, subsequently receiving a £175,000 investment from British entrepreneur Peter Jones.

References 

2005 establishments in the United Kingdom
Magazines established in 2005
Bi-monthly magazines published in the United Kingdom
Fashion magazines published in the United Kingdom
Independent magazines
Lifestyle magazines published in the United Kingdom
Magazines published in London